Thomas Joseph Lavin (born December 7, 1976) is an American BMX cyclist and the host of MTV's reality competition series The Challenge since its eleventh season.

Early life
Thomas Joseph Lavin was born  in Las Vegas, Nevada.  Lavin first began to ride bikes when he was two. He eventually became a professional winning his first pro contest at the age of nineteen.

Career

BMX
He has entered events including the X Games and the Dew Tour. In the X Games he took bronze three times, silver once, and gold three times (One was Australian). He has been a DK Dirt Circuit Champion, a champion in the Gravity Games, a European championship winner, and a CFB Champion.  In 1995, he was crowned the "King of Dirt." He has a  BMX track in his backyard which includes several groomed trails and dirt jumps.

Lavin was competing in a Dew Tour event in Las Vegas on October 14, 2010, where he crashed and was rushed to the hospital. Due to the critical injuries he sustained, he was put into a medically induced coma and developed a case of pneumonia shortly after. On October 20, Chas Aday, friend of Lavin, reported that Lavin was breathing on his own, following simple commands like squeezing hands or giving thumbs-up to the doctors and he was expected to make a full recovery. Lavin was able to return home on November 16, 2010.

According to Bleacher Report he is considered one of the greatest BMX riders of all time.

Lavin was included into the USA BMX Hall of Fame on October 29, 2022 in Tulsa, Oklahoma, USA. Source: https://www.usabmx.com/site/sections/8  See photo of Hall of Fame Inductees for 2022.

Music
Self taught in playing the piano, Lavin used the recording studio in his home to record and release an album called LAVS the First SET.

In 2008, Lavin released the single "Soldier" — a tribute to his long-time friend Stephen Murray. Stephen crashed during the Dew Action Sports Tour in Baltimore. He suffered a serious spinal injury during a double-backflip attempt on June 22, 2007. All sales from the single were donated to the Stephen Murray Family Fund.

MTV
Lavin is the subject of the film A Film about T. J. Lavin. He appeared on an episode of MTV's Cribs. 

He has hosted spin-offs, specials, and MTV's reality-competition show The Challenge (originally titled Real World/Road Rules Challenge) since its eleventh season.

The Challenge

 Real World/Road Rules Challenge: The Gauntlet 2 (2005–2006)
 Real World/Road Rules Challenge: Fresh Meat (2006)
 Real World/Road Rules Challenge: The Duel (2006–2007)
 Real World/Road Rules Challenge: The Inferno 3 (2007)
 Real World/Road Rules Challenge: The Gauntlet III (2008)
 Real World/Road Rules Challenge: The Island (2008)
 Real World/Road Rules Challenge: The Duel II (2009)
 Real World/Road Rules Challenge: The Ruins (2009)
 Spring Break Challenge (2010)
 The Challenge: Fresh Meat II (2010)
 The Challenge: Cutthroat (2010)
 The Challenge: Rivals (2011)
 The Challenge: Battle of the Exes (2012)
 The Challenge: Battle of the Seasons (2012)
 The Challenge: Rivals II (2013)
 The Challenge: Free Agents (2014)
 The Challenge: Battle of the Exes II (2015)
 The Challenge: Battle of the Bloodlines (2015–2016)
 The Challenge: Rivals III (2016)
 The Challenge: Invasion of the Champions (2017)
 The Challenge XXX: Dirty 30 (2017)
 The Challenge: Vendettas (2018)
 The Challenge: Final Reckoning (2018)
 The Challenge: War of the Worlds (2019)
 The Challenge: War of the Worlds 2 (2019)
 The Challenge: Total Madness (2020)
 The Challenge: Double Agents (2020-2021)
 The Challenge: All Stars (2021)
 The Challenge: Spies, Lies & Allies (2021)
 The Challenge: All Stars 2 (2021-2022)
 The Challenge: All Stars 3 (2022)
 The Challenge: USA (2022)
 The Challenge: Ride or Dies (2022- present)

Personal life
He married his longtime girlfriend Roxanne Siordia on November 2, 2012, in Las Vegas. The couple had been together for eight years and married on their anniversary. Through Siordia, Lavin has one stepdaughter, whom he has since adopted.

References

External links
 Personal website
 

Living people
American male cyclists
People from the Las Vegas Valley
X Games athletes
1976 births
BMX riders